Thomas James Willis Fleming (19 June 1819 – 7 March 1890) was an English landed proprietor and Conservative Member of Parliament.

He was the second son of John Willis Fleming of North Stoneham Park. He was educated at Eton and Trinity College, Oxford. He was called to the bar of the Middle Temple on 27 January 1843.

His political career was brief. He twice unsuccessfully contested the Isle of Wight seat, in 1847 and 1857. He first contested Winchester in the general election of 1859, when he stood unsuccessfully in alliance with the sitting Conservative MP Sir James Buller East against the two Liberal candidates. Then in February 1864, Sir James Buller East retired and Thomas was returned unopposed. He was defeated at the general election in July 1865.

In 1845 he married Caroline Hunter, by whom he had three sons and four daughters. He died in 1890 at Bern, Switzerland, and was buried at the Bremgartenfriedhof.

Sources
 The Willis Fleming Historical Trust: papers and biographical file

Notes

External links
 

1819 births
1890 deaths
Conservative Party (UK) MPs for English constituencies
People educated at Eton College
Alumni of Trinity College, Oxford
UK MPs 1859–1865